Masu Bhurgri is a Union council of Hyderabad Taluka (rural) in the Sindh province of Pakistan.

References

Populated places in Hyderabad District, Pakistan
Union councils of Sindh